Paractaenum is a genus of Australian plants in the grass family.

The genus name, Paractaenum, comes from the Greek, παραkτείνω, meaning "I extend".

 Species
 Paractaenum novae-hollandiae  P.Beauv. - Australia (Northern Territory, all states except Tasmania)
 Paractaenum refractum  (F.Muell.) R.D.Webster - Australia (Northern Territory, all states except Tasmania + Victoria)

References

Panicoideae
Poaceae genera
Flora of Australia